The 1830 Connecticut gubernatorial election was held on April 8, 1830. Incumbent governor and National Republican nominee Gideon Tomlinson ran essentially unopposed, winning with 96.19% of the vote amidst a scattering of votes.

Tomlinson would resign on March 2, 1831, to take his seat in the United States Senate, making John Samuel Peters the acting governor for the remainder of his term until May 4, 1831.

General election

Candidates
Major party candidates

Gideon Tomlinson, National Republican

Results

References

1830
Connecticut
Gubernatorial